Andrej Hebar (born 7 September 1984) is a Slovenian professional ice hockey forward who currently plays for Újpesti TE in the Erste Liga. He participated at the 2011 IIHF World Championship as a member of the Slovenia men's national ice hockey team.

Career statistics

Regular season and playoffs

International

References

External links

1984 births
Living people
Slovenian ice hockey forwards
HK Acroni Jesenice players
Brûleurs de Loups players
Colorado Eagles players
HC Havířov players
KHL Medveščak Zagreb players
HC Oceláři Třinec players
HDD Olimpija Ljubljana players
HC Olomouc players
HC Slezan Opava players
Sportspeople from Ljubljana
IF Troja/Ljungby players
Újpesti TE (ice hockey) players
HKM Zvolen players
Ice hockey players at the 2018 Winter Olympics
Olympic ice hockey players of Slovenia
Slovenian expatriate sportspeople in Slovakia
Slovenian expatriate sportspeople in Sweden
Slovenian expatriate sportspeople in the United States
Slovenian expatriate sportspeople in the Czech Republic
Slovenian expatriate sportspeople in Croatia
Slovenian expatriate sportspeople in France
Slovenian expatriate sportspeople in Hungary
Expatriate ice hockey players in Slovakia
Expatriate ice hockey players in Sweden
Expatriate ice hockey players in the United States
Expatriate ice hockey players in the Czech Republic
Expatriate ice hockey players in Croatia
Expatriate ice hockey players in France
Expatriate ice hockey players in Hungary
Slovenian expatriate ice hockey people